Spring Day is an American comedian, writer and actress currently working in the UK. She was voted Brooklyn's Best Comedian in 2016.

Early life 
Day was born and grew up in Kansas City, Missouri, in a house containing 20 dogs, five rats, three cats, two birds and a ferret. From the age of 13, Day knew she wanted to live in Japan and would later study there as an exchange student.

Career 
After being fired on her first day from a teaching job in central Japan, Day moved to Tokyo and took up comedy after seeing an advert in an English language magazine.

Day learned her craft in the Japanese comedy scene, headlining at the Tokyo Comedy Store from 2002. In 2004 she opened for Japanese comedian Zenjiro at the Melbourne Comedy Festival. She has gone on to gig around the world, including clubs in London, Manchester, Dublin, Los Angeles, New York and Paris.

Beginning in 2010, she has written, directed and performed five solo shows at the Edinburgh Fringe.

She has appeared in the 2014 book The Humour Code and the 2017 book Joker Face alongside Jimmy Carr, Sara Pascoe, Russell Howard and Katherine Ryan. She was also featured in the 2008 documentary The Tokyo Comedy Store.

In 2020, Day performed alongside fellow Americans Hopwood Depree and Will Franken in a Yank in the UK stand-up gig at the Leicester Comedy Festival. She had intended to take her show Spring Day: Dark Comedy for Nice People to the 2020 Edinburgh Fringe until its cancellation due to the COVID-19 pandemic.

In 2020 Day also appeared on the You'll Do podcast with Sarah Keyworth and Catherine Bohart alongside Tim Renkow.

Personal life 
Day has mild cerebral palsy. She is married to fellow comedian Tim Renkow.

References 

American women comedians
American actresses
American women writers
People with cerebral palsy
People from Kansas City, Missouri
Living people
Year of birth missing (living people)
21st-century American women